Tinagma signatum is a moth in the Douglasiidae family. It is found in the Austria, the Czech Republic, Slovakia, Germany, Italy and Russia.

The larvae possibly feed on Geum montanum.

References

Moths described in 1991
Douglasiidae